Mokobé Traoré (born 24 May 1976 in Vitry-sur-Seine, France), better known by the mononym Mokobé, is a Malian–French rapper and part of the music collective 113 alongside Rim'K and AP and within the greater French musical project and collective Mafia K-1 Fry. He also has his own solo career with two album releases Mon Afrique in 2007 and Africa Forever in 2011.

Mokobé was born to a Malian–Senegalese father and a Malian–Mauritanian mother. He was a founding member of 113 and his works appeared in the collective albums of the band. He was also actively involved in the artistic aspects of the band and took part in the live shows of the band. He was also responsible for the band's mediatic image (Visuals, music videos, DVDs, interviews, public relations), becoming a de facto manager of the 113 operations.

His solo album Mon Afrique was in collaboration with David Tayorault in Abidjan and was released on 11 June 2007. Le Molare, Tiken Jah Fakoly, Oumou Sangaré, Patson, Fally Ipupa, and hip hop stars like Diam's and Booba.

His album Africa Forever included collaborations with Soprano), 
Nathalie Bleue, Oumou Sangare, Despo Rutti, Fode Baro, J-Mi Sissoko, Jah Cure, Mbaye Dieye Faye, Soumbill and Apocalypse.

Discography

Solo albums

Albums with 113
2000: Les Princes de la ville (certified platinum)
2002: 113 fout la merde (certified gold)
2003: Dans L'urgence (reedition) (certified gold)
2005: 113 Degrés (certified gold)
2010: Universel

Singles

Other releases
2011: "50 CFA"
2011: "Taxi Phone" (feat. Soprano)
2012: "Africa For Ever" (feat. Jah Cure)

Featured in

References

External links
Last.fm: Mokobé page

1976 births
Living people
French rappers
French people of Malian descent
French people of Senegalese descent
French people of Mauritanian descent
People from Vitry-sur-Seine
Rappers from Val-de-Marne
Male rappers